The Curse of the Hidden Vault is a 1964 black and white West German crime film directed by Franz Josef Gottlieb and starring Harald Leipnitz, Eddi Arent, Siegfried Schürenberg and Klaus Kinski. It is based on the 1908 novel Angel Esquire by Edgar Wallace, previously made into a British silent film..

It was shot at the Spandau Studios and Tempelhof Studios in Berlin and on location in London. The film's sets were designed by the art directors Wilhelm Vorwerg and Walter Kutz.

Cast
 Harald Leipnitz as Jimmy Flynn
 Judith Dornys as Kathleen Kent
 Rudolf Forster as Real
 Werner Peters as Spedding
 Ernst Fritz Fürbringer as Connor
 Siegfried Schürenberg as Sir John
 Harry Meyen as Inspector Angel
 Vera Tschechowa as Feder-Lissy
 Ilse Steppat as Margaret
 Harry Wüstenhagen as Goyle
  as Cyril
 Klaus Kinski as George
 Eddi Arent as Ferry Westlake
 Kurt Waitzmann as Mr. Simpson
  as Bat Sand
  as Vinnis

Reception
The FSK gave the film a rating of "16 and older" and found it not appropriate for screenings on public holidays. The film premiered on 30 April 1964.

References

Bibliography
 Bergfelder, Tim. International Adventures: German Popular Cinema and European Co-Productions in the 1960s. Berghahn Books, 2005.

External links

1964 films
1960s mystery films
1960s crime thriller films
1960s German-language films
German mystery films
German crime thriller films
West German films
German black-and-white films
Films directed by Franz Josef Gottlieb
Films based on British novels
Films based on works by Edgar Wallace
Films set in England
Films set in London
Films shot at Tempelhof Studios
Films shot at Spandau Studios
Constantin Film films
1960s German films